Ivan Kuzmich Kondratyev ( in Belarus –  in Moscow) was a Russian Empire writer, playwright and poet. According to Ivan Belousov, Kondratyev was a member of Vasily Surikov's circle.

Kondratyev authored a novel called Saltychikha, numerous short stories, plays, poetry (The Death of Attilla, Pushkin and the Gypsy, Stenka Razin's Feast), historical essays (The grey olden times of Moscow) and translations, as well as two collections: Думы и были (Thoughts and True Stories, Moscow, 1884) and Под  шум  дубрав.  Песни.  Думы.  Былины.  Народные  сказания (Under the Noise of Oak Groves. Songs, Thoughts, Epic Poems, Popular Stories, Moscow, 1898). Both Belousov and Korney Chukovsky were highly critical of Kondratyev's work.

Kondratyev is also known as an expert on songs, publishing several studies on popular Russian songs, the most important of these studies being: You Russian Song, Those Are the Songs of My Motherland and The Power of Song. Many of his poems are written in the tradition of Russian songs and have been used as lyrics for songs by Vasily Andreyevich Zolotaryov and other less known composers. He also wrote the lyrics for various popular romances, the best known of these being Charming Eyes. He is also credited with the lyrics of the song On the Wild Steppes of Transbaikalya

References

1849 births
1904 deaths
People from Vileyka District
People from Vileysky Uyezd
Poets from the Russian Empire
Male writers from the Russian Empire
Russian male poets
Writers from the Russian Empire
19th-century poets
19th-century male writers from the Russian Empire
S.M. Kirov Military Medical Academy alumni